The 1944 Eastern Illinois Panthers football team represented Eastern Illinois University as a member of the Illinois Intercollegiate Athletic Conference (IIAC) during the 1944 college football season. The team was led by first-year head coach Charles Lantz and played their home games at Schahrer Field in Charleston, Illinois. The Panthers finished the season with a 1–3 record overall and a 1–2 record in conference play.

Schedule

References

Eastern Illinois
Eastern Illinois Panthers football seasons
Eastern Illinois Panthers football